The Olympus Zuiko Digital ED 7-14mm 1:4.0 is an interchangeable camera lens for DSLR cameras using the Four Thirds system announced by Olympus Corporation on September 27, 2004.

References

External links
 

007-014mm f 4.0 ED
Camera lenses introduced in 2004